State Road 826 (SR 826) is a bypass route around the greater Miami area, traveling approximately  in a northeasterly arc from U.S. Route 1 (US 1) in Pinecrest to its terminus at State Road A1A in Sunny Isles Beach. Between its southern terminus and the Golden Glades Interchange, State Road 826 is known as the Palmetto Expressway, a heavily traveled freeway with portions of the road carrying in excess of 250,000 vehicles a day. Unlike many of the other non-interstate freeways in Miami-Dade County, the Palmetto Expressway is untolled. East of the interchange, State Road 826 is a surface road connecting North Miami and North Miami Beach to Sunny Isles Beach over the Intracoastal Waterway.

Route description

Palmetto Expressway

SR 826 is signed east-west north of Miami, west of Miami it is signed north-south.

State Road 826 begins at an interchange with US 1 in Pinecrest, just south of the Dadeland Mall, and heads north as the Palmetto Expressway into Kendall. The first interchange, less than a mile (1.6 km) north of US 1, is with Kendall Drive (SR 94), which provides access to the mall. SR 826 continues north, crossing under the Snapper Creek Expressway (SR 878) without an interchange before meeting Sunset Drive (SR 986) at a diamond interchange. It then leaves Kendall, continuing into Glenvar Heights with an interchange with Southwest 56th Street/Miller Drive, which provides access to the University of Miami. About half a mile (0.8 km) later, the Don Shula Expressway (SR 874) merges with the Palmetto Expressway at its northern terminus, with a southbound exit and a northbound entrance point. Between this interchange and the next (at Bird Road/SR 976), SR 826 forms the border between Glenvar Heights and Olympia Heights; past it, the expressway marks the boundary between Westchester and Coral Terrace. After an exit with Southwest 24th Street/Coral Way, the expressway meets the Tamiami Trail (US 41), providing access to Florida International University. This interchange also marks the Tamiami Trail's entrance into incorporated Miami, the boundary of which lies on the eastern side of the expressway.

North of the Tamiami Trail interchange, the Palmetto Expressway forms the eastern boundary of Fontainebleau as it continues north to an exit with Flagler Street (SR 968), the north–south baseline for Miami-Dade County roads. The freeway then has an interchange with the Dolphin Expressway (SR 836) just south of Doral, creating access to Miami International Airport. This interchange is currently being improved due to the current configuration causing severe congestion. Now forming Doral's eastern boundary, SR 826 continues north to Northwest 25th Street, which connects to the western end of the airport, followed by an exit with Doral Boulevard (SR 948) that links to the Doral Golf Resort & Spa, and then an exit with Northwest 58th Street. After a brief crossing through unincorporated Miami-Dade County, the expressway reaches an interchange with the Hialeah Expressway (SR 934) in Medley adjacent to the Palmetto Metrorail station, followed by a diagonal interchange with US 27 at the southern end of Hialeah Gardens and Hialeah. It then enters Hialeah proper just after an interchange with Northwest 103rd Street (SR 932), which allows access to the Westland Mall. An exit with Northwest 122nd Street then follows.

At the boundary between Hialeah and Miami Lakes, SR 826 reaches an interchange with the national southern terminus of Interstate 75 (I-75) and the western termini of the Gratigny Parkway (SR 924) and SR 916. The Palmetto Expressway goes into Miami Lakes, interchanges with Northwest 154 Street, then turns through 90 degrees to the east at a point known as "The Big Curve". The road then proceeds straight east, forming the boundary between Miami Lakes and Country Club, soon interchanging with Northwest 67th Avenue. At the next exit, Red Road (SR 823), the expressway forms the boundary between an unincorporated section of Miami-Dade County and Miami Gardens, with the expressway entering the city proper at the next exit, Northwest 47th Avenue. The expressway then passes to the north of Florida Memorial University before the Northwest 37th Avenue exit, where it creates the northern border of St. Thomas University's campus. Still in Miami Gardens, SR 826 then has exits with Northwest 27th Avenue (SR 817), Northwest 17th Avenue and Northwest 12th Avenue before reaching the Golden Glades Interchange.

SR 826 takes a convoluted path through the Golden Glades Interchange. It first meets the connector ramps between Florida's Turnpike and Interstate 95 (I-95), allowing access from northbound SR 826 to I-95 southbound as well as US 441/SR 9 southbound, and from the Turnpike southbound and I-95 northbound to southbound SR 826. After turning to the northeast, SR 826 moves off its mainline at the next exit onto the mainline of the Turnpike which passes over it; SR 826's former mainline, meanwhile, continues on as an at-grade extension of Northwest 7th Avenue to US 441 northbound. Traffic moving from eastbound SR 826 to the northbound Turnpike must pass through an unsignalised intersection here. Headed back southeast, SR 826 first crosses over the former Seaboard Coast Line railroad, begins to form the northern boundary of Golden Glades, then passes under the I-95's express lanes, meeting the onramp between I-95 southbound and the Turnpike northbound, and the onramp between southbound US 441 and eastbound SR 826. It then passes over Interstate 95 proper, which lies between the southbound and northbound carriageways of US 441, as it swings back to the northeast and then to the east once more. Here it meets its last three ramps, one which allows access from US 441 and I-95 northbound to eastbound SR 826, another from westbound SR 826 to US 441 and I-95 southbound, and from westbound SR 826 to northbound US 441. SR 826 resumes its east–west orientation once more at a signalised intersection with Northwest 2nd Avenue, marking the end of SR 826's expressway.

Non-expressway section
 State Road 826 heads east from the Golden Glades Interchange as Northwest 167th Street, a six-laned surface road, along the boundary between Golden Glades and North Miami Beach. Through here, the road is also known as North Miami Beach Boulevard, lined with shops, offices, hotels and other commercial services. Two blocks after leaving the interchange, the road crosses North Miami Avenue, the longitudinal baseline for Miami-Dade County; thus, the road becomes Northeast 167th Street once it passes this point. Approximately  later, SR 826 intersects with Northeast 6th Avenue (SR 915). Two blocks later, at Northeast 8th Avenue, North Miami Beach Boulevard starts to swing to the southeast, leaving Northeast 167th Street's orientation, reaching Northeast 163rd street approximately  later at Northeast 12th Avenue, and taking its eastbound orientation. It immediately passes the Mall at 163rd Street on its left, continuing on as a shopping strip for another  where it meets the northern terminus of SR 909 at the West Dixie Highway. One block later, after crossing the Florida East Coast Railway tracks, SR 826 meets US 1 once more at Biscayne Boulevard.

To the east of US 1, SR 826's character changes as it passes through mangroves and crosses the Oleta River, having expanded to eight lanes. With North Miami Beach lying to the north and North Miami to the south of the road, SR 826 passes between more mangroves to its south and more businesses to the north as it approaches the Intracoastal Waterway. Here, the road splits into separate eastbound and westbound streets before it crosses the Waterway over a drawbridge in each direction, and enters Sunny Isles Beach. Apartment buildings line the outside of the two road-halves, with some commercial services in the middle, as it continues on for another  to SR 826's northern terminus at Collins Avenue (SR A1A), one block shy of the Atlantic Ocean. A flyover allows traffic on northbound SR A1A to move onto westbound SR 826 without having to stop twice for eastbound SR 826 traffic and to cross SR A1A.

Traffic volume

The traffic volume along SR 826's entire length is measured by the Florida Department of Transportation. The busiest sections of SR 826 are in the vicinity of the Miami International Airport and the nearby industrial area to its west, with over 200,000 daily vehicle movements counted between the Dolphin Expressway at Fontainebleau and the Northwest 122nd Street / West 68th Street exit in Hialeah, peaking in the vicinity of SR 934 in Medley with over 250,000 vehicle movements each day.

Traffic volumes decrease to the south of the Dolphin Expressway, particularly south of the Don Shula Expressway merge; however, unlike the rest of SR 826 (including its surface road portion), much of its peak traffic flow is uni-directional. Indeed, at the Palmetto Expressway's southern end, between US 1 and Kendall Drive, traffic moves almost exclusively in the peak direction.

Northwards, traffic volumes decrease after the interchange with I-75 and the Gratigny Parkway, with a reported drop of approximately 60,000 daily vehicle movements north of the interchange. As the Palmetto Expressway rounds the Big Curve and heads eastwards, the traffic volume steadily increases to a maximum of 164,000 daily vehicle movements just prior to the Golden Glades Interchange as it collects traffic from the north–south routes in the Miami Gardens area.

East of the interchange, where SR 826 becomes a surface road, the traffic volumes are more than halved in comparison to SR 826's expressway sections, with a recorded figure of 64,500 daily vehicle movements. This figure steadily decreases eastwards along SR 826, with only 46,000 daily vehicle movements recorded near its eastern terminus with SR A1A in Sunny Isles Beach.

History

  State Road 826's designation originally applied to a two-lane road (Golden Glades Drive, Northwest 167th Street) connecting US 27 to US 441 in the vicinity of the Golden Glades Interchange.

In 1956, plans were unveiled for several expressways throughout Dade County. The routes proposed were a North-South Expressway (now part of I-95), an East-West Expressway (now the Dolphin Expressway), a 36th Street Expressway (now the Airport Expressway), the Biscayne Bay Malecon (a proposed downtown loop, never built), a Dixie Expressway (proposed; most was never built, a portion became I-95), and the Palmetto Road Expressway. In 1957, Dade County Commissioner Ralph Fossey proposed an alternative alignment of the Palmetto Expressway. The route would then turn south at Southwest 117th Avenue and follow it into US 1. While the alternate route plan ultimately failed, eventually the Don Shula Expressway, a northeast-southwest expressway, was built along the railroad tracks in the 1970s.

In 1958, the State Road Department started construction on the bypass expressway under their authority. A north–south section along West 77th Avenue (Palmetto Road) was built to connect US 1 in Pinecrest to an improved Golden Glades Drive (complete with 90 degree eastward turn) and the portion of Northwest 167th Street west of the curve would be abandoned. Many land owners were forced to sell their property to the county to make way for the construction of the expressway. The Palmetto Expressway was opened in June 1961 at the cost of $30 million, four years after the opening of Florida's Turnpike and six months before the opening of Dade County's second expressway, the Airport Expressway (SR 112).

The completion of the Palmetto Expressway (the "Bypass" faded from public usage in the 1960s) and the building of Interstate 95 were the impetus of the construction of the massive Golden Glades Interchange involving Florida's Turnpike, US 441, Interstate 95, and SR 9.

When the Palmetto Expressway was first opened, it went through tracts of woodland and farmland which have since been urbanized. Originally there were four at-grade intersections in Hialeah and Miami Lakes which were either transformed into full interchanges or blocked off in the 1970s. In addition, increasing traffic loads on the Palmetto prompted plans for extending Florida's Turnpike to "bypass the bypass." In 1974, the Homestead Extension of Florida's Turnpike was opened to traffic four miles (6.4 km) to the west of the Palmetto to reduce the traffic demands on Miami's original bypass.

The Florida Department of Transportation recently completed a project on a  section of the Palmetto Expressway from the southern terminus to just north of the Northwest 154th Street interchange, widening the highway by two lanes (from eight lanes to ten and ten lanes to twelve) and improving the interchanges. Reconstruction of the Miller Drive, Bird Road and Don Shula Expressway interchanges began in 2008, and was completed around 2012. The Dolphin-Palmetto Interchange construction began on November 30, 2009, and was completed in late 2016.

The Florida Department of Transportation is in the process of adding express lanes on the Palmetto Expressway between West Flagler Street and Northwest 154th Street, which will connect with new express lanes on Interstate 75. This will result in four regular and two express lanes, similar to 95 express.

Exit list

See also

References

External links

Florida@SouthEast Roads-Florida 826
Palmetto Expressway (SR 826) Projects

826
826
Freeways in the United States
Expressways in Miami
Expressways in Miami-Dade County, Florida
Miami Gardens, Florida
North Miami Beach, Florida
1945 establishments in Florida